Yasmine Daghfous (born 1 January 2000) is a Tunisian fencer. She competed in the women's sabre event at the 2020 Summer Olympics in Tokyo, Japan. She also competed in the women's team sabre event.

She competed at the 2022 Mediterranean Games held in Oran, Algeria.

References

External links 
 

Living people
2000 births
Place of birth missing (living people)
Tunisian female sabre fencers
Fencers at the 2020 Summer Olympics
Olympic fencers of Tunisia
Mediterranean Games competitors for Tunisia
Competitors at the 2022 Mediterranean Games
21st-century Tunisian women